Matthew James "Matt" Connealy (born December 11, 1951) is a former member the Nebraska Legislature, and former executive director of the Nebraska Democratic Party.

Personal life
Born in Oakland, Nebraska, he graduated from Decatur High School in 1970. He attended the University of St. Thomas in Saint Paul, Minnesota, and the University of Nebraska-Lincoln from 1970 to 1973.

Career
He was elected in 1998 to represent the 16th Nebraska legislative district and reelected in 2002. He sat on the General Affairs committee and was vice chairperson of the Revenue, Urban Affairs, and Building Maintenance committees. Due to term limits approved by Nebraska voters in Initiative Measure 415 in 2001, state senators are limited to two terms, and Connealy was "termed out" in 2006.

Campaigns and elections 

Connealy won a competitive four-way primary on Tuesday, May 11, 2004 with 50.2% of the vote, defeating Janet Stewart, Charlie Matulka, and Phil Chase for the nomination. In the general election, Republican Jeff Fortenberry defeated State Senator Matt Connealy 54%-43%. Connealy won only two counties: Thurston and Burt.

In 2006, Connealy unsuccessfully sought elective office as Nebraska Public Service Commissioner for district 3. Connealy was defeated by Tim Schram 56%-44%.

References

External links
 The Washington Post 2004 election results
 
 Endorsement of Connealy by the Catholic Democrats of Nebraska

1951 births
Living people
Democratic Party Nebraska state senators
University of Nebraska alumni
People from Oakland, Nebraska
People from Decatur, Nebraska
Catholics from Nebraska